Ning may refer to:

Places
 Ning County, county in Gansu, China
 Ning River, tributary of Mei River, originating and running through Xingning, China
 Ningxia, abbreviated as Ning, Hui autonomous region of China
 Nanjing, abbreviated as Ning, capital of Jiangsu Province, China

Other uses
 Ning (surname), a Chinese surname
 Ning (website), an American online platform for people to create their own social networks